Angonyx meeki is a moth of the  family Sphingidae. It is known from the Solomon Islands.

References

Angonyx
Moths described in 1903
Moths of Oceania